The People's Participation Party (PPP) was a political party of South Korea. It was formed by many of the former members of the Uri Party after the death of former President Roh Moo-hyun. Rhyu Si-min was elected as Party Chairman on March 19, 2011. In March 2011 it had 45,335 members. For the April 27 by-elections, the People's Participation Party has cooperated with the Democratic Party to enter Lee Bong-su as the single opposition candidate for the Kimhae seat in the National Assembly of South Korea. On 5 December 2011, it merged into the Unified Progressive Party.

Notable members
 Rhyu Si-min, 유시민, former Minister of Health and Welfare and National Assembly MP
 Cheon Ho-sun, 천호선, former Speaker of the Blue House
 Lee Byeong-Wan, 이병완, former Chief of Staff of Presidents Kim Dae-jung and Roh Moo-hyun

See also
 Politics of South Korea
 Lists of political parties
 Justice Party (South Korea)

References

Defunct political parties in South Korea
Liberal parties in South Korea
Progressive parties in South Korea
Political parties established in 2010
2010 establishments in South Korea
Political parties disestablished in 2011
2011 disestablishments in South Korea